Miyu is a rural mountain village in the Corail commune of the Corail Arrondissement, in the Grand'Anse department of Haiti.

References

Populated places in Grand'Anse (department)